Kafeŕoor is a "mythical vanishing island" location in Pacific and Polynesian mythology, recorded in the traditional celestial navigation techniques of the Caroline Islands. Part of the Trigger fishes tied together mnemonic-navigational system, it is sometimes grouped with Fanuankuwel as a 'ghost island'.

See also
Celestial navigation
Fanuankuwel
Polynesian mythology
Polynesian navigation
Micronesian navigation
Wa (watercraft)
Phantom island

References

Polynesian mythology

Mythological islands